Christopher Gulaptis is a member of the New South Wales Legislative Assembly. He has represented Clarence for The Nationals since the 2011 by-election.

Background and early career
Of Macedonian background, Gulaptis was born in Perth, Western Australia, and graduated with a degree in applied science from the Western Australian Institute of Technology (now Curtin University) and commenced practice as a surveyor. He moved to Clarence Valley in New South Wales in 1980, and was a councillor on Maclean Shire Council, where he also served as mayor. His service as a councillor ceased when all five local government councils in the Clarence Valley were amalgamated into one council, the Clarence Valley Council.

Gulaptis successfully stood at the first Clarence Valley local government election in 2005 and served as one of nine councillors. He unsuccessfully stood for mayor of the new council in March and September 2005 and September 2006 and resigned as a councillor in 2008.

Parliamentary career
Gulaptis contested the seat of Page at the 2007 federal election. Although capturing the majority of primary votes, he lost to the Labor candidate, Janelle Saffin, after distribution of preferences.  Gulaptis retained his Lower Clarence residence but took employment in Queensland in the interim, and returned to the Clarence Valley when he was pre-selected as Nationals candidate in the Clarence by-election.

Following the Australian greyhound racing live baiting scandal and the decision by the Baird government to ban greyhound racing NSW from 1 July 2017, legislation was introduced into the NSW Legislative Assembly and Gulaptis crossed the floor to vote against the government. At the time of the vote Gulaptis was the Parliamentary Secretary for the North Coast; however, the following day he was informed that was no longer a parliamentary secretary.

References

 

Year of birth missing (living people)
National Party of Australia members of the Parliament of New South Wales
Living people
Members of the New South Wales Legislative Assembly
Politicians from Perth, Western Australia
Curtin University alumni
Australian people of Greek descent
21st-century Australian politicians